Wanda Grażyna Gałecka-Szmurło (21 August 1899 in Warsaw - 10 January 1993) was a Polish lawyer, independence and social activist, the second woman in Poland who was entered on the list of lawyers. 

She conducted intensive social and journalistic activities in the field of law, she also participated in legislative works in the field of matrimonial property law. Advocate Wanda Grażyna Szmurło was appointed by the Minister of National Defense Janusz Onyszkiewicz (by order of 3 July 1992) a second lieutenant in the Polish Army.

References

1899 births
1993 deaths
Lawyers from Warsaw
20th-century women lawyers